Zdenko Adamović (born 20 December 1963, in Osijek) is a Croatian football manager and former player.

Playing career
During his career, he played for some important Yugoslav clubs, such as NK Osijek, Hajduk Split, FK Vojvodina, and Čelik Zenica, before moving to Germany where he played for SpVgg Bayreuth and FC Augsburg.

Managerial career
He was appointed manager of Sloga Ljubuški in March 2015, took charge of NK Val in July 2015 and coached Belišće in 2017.

References

External sources
 Profile at Playerhistory
 
 spvgg-bayreuth.de
 altstadt-kult.de
 
 [https://arhiv.slobodnadalmacija.hr/pvpages/pvpages/viewPage/?pv_page_id=738752 https://arhiv.slobodnadalmacija.hr/pvpages/pvpages/viewPage/?pv_page_id=745555
Match reports while playing for Uskok and DOŠK]

1963 births
Living people
Footballers from Osijek
Association football forwards
Yugoslav footballers
Croatian footballers
HNK Hajduk Split players
NK Osijek players
FK Vojvodina players
NK Čelik Zenica players
SpVgg Bayreuth players
FC Augsburg players
NK Primorac 1929 players
Yugoslav First League players
Bayernliga players
First Football League (Croatia) players
Croatian expatriate footballers
Expatriate footballers in Germany
Croatian expatriate sportspeople in Germany
Croatian football managers
NK Belišće managers
Croatian expatriate football managers
Expatriate football managers in Bosnia and Herzegovina
Croatian expatriate sportspeople in Bosnia and Herzegovina